Shivaramaiah Ramachandra Aithal (16 November 194810 January 2011), popularly known as S. Ramachandra, was a National Award winning Indian cinematographer. In 2006, he was honoured with Lifetime Contribution to Kannada Cinema Award at the Karnataka State Film Awards. He was recognised as a gifted cinematographer and as a force behind the offbeat films in Kannada cinema.

Career
After securing fifth rank in the Pre-University Course, Ramachandra went to the National Film and Television Institute in Pune to learn Cinematography. Upon returning he worked as the Assistant Cameraman for U.M.N. Sharif, who shot Vamsha Vriksha directed by Girish Karnad and B.V. Karanth. It was during the shooting of Vamsha Vriksha that P.V. Nanjaraja Urs, who identified Ramachandra's talent, asked him to work for his feature film "Sankalpa" which was Ramachandra's first venture as an Independent Cinematographer. He later worked with B.V. Karanth for the Award Winning film Chomana Dudi. He also worked in commercial films with directors like Nagabharana and K.V.Jayaram.

S. Ramachandra's work in films directed by Girish Kasaravalli brought him accolades. His association with Girish Kasaravalli began with the National Award winning film Ghatashradhdha. Later he worked on Akramana, Mane, Kraurya, Naayi Neralu, Hasina and Gulabi Talkies.

Professional
He was the President of Karnataka Cinematographer's Association for nearly a decade, where he worked to secure the future of Cinematographers of the Kannada Film Industry

He was a founding member of Chitrasamuha, a filmmakers' platform for appreciation of cinema aesthetics and he remained an active contributor until his death.

Critical acclaim 
Following quotes are about S. Ramachandra and his work.

Awards
  1977: National Film Award for Best Cinematography for Rishya Shringa
  2006: Lifetime Contribution to Kannada Cinema Award
  Karnataka State Film Award for Best Cinematography
 1972–73: Sankalpa
 1976–77: Rushya Shringa
 1978–79: Grahana
 1989–90: Mane

Death
S. Ramachandra was suffering from cancer. He was admitted to the Bangalore Institute of Oncology where he was pronounced dead on 10 January 2011.

Chitra Varsha: Cinematography of Ramachandra, a year long festival of his films was organised by Chitra Samuha and K. V. Subbanna Aptha Samuha in 2011.

At least one film 'Thallana' is dedicated to him.

Filmography

Television

Films
An incomplete list of S. Ramachandra's Films also highlights his association with Award winning Films

References

External links
 

Kannada film cinematographers
2011 deaths
Filmfare Awards winners
Best Cinematography National Film Award winners
1948 births
Artists from Bangalore
Cinematographers from Karnataka
20th-century Indian photographers
21st-century Indian photographers
Recipients of the Rajyotsava Award 2004